Saint Ia of Cornwall (also known as Eia, Hia or Hya) was an evangelist and martyr of the 5th or 6th centuries in Cornwall. She is said to have been an Irish princess, the sister of Erc of Slane and a student of Saint Baricus.

Legend
Ia went to the seashore to depart for Cornwall from her native Ireland along with other saints. Finding that they had gone without her, fearing that she was too young for such a hazardous journey, she was grief-stricken and began to pray. As she prayed, she noticed a small leaf floating on the water and touched it with a rod to see if it would sink. As she watched, it grew bigger and bigger. Trusting God, she embarked upon the leaf and was carried across the Irish Sea. She reached Cornwall before the others, where she joined Saint Gwinear and Felec of Cornwall.

Legend holds that they had up to 777 companions. She is said to have founded an oratory in a clearing in a wood on the site of the existing Parish Church that is dedicated to her. Ia was martyred under "King Teudar" (i.e., Tewdwr Mawr of Penwith) on the River Hayle and buried at what is now St Ives, where St Ia's Church—of which she is now the patron saint—was erected over her grave. The town built up around it, and the nearby Catholic church is dedicated to the Sacred Heart and St Ia. Her feast day is 3 February.

A now ruined chapel near Troon was also dedicated to her. The church of Plouyé in Brittany was probably dedicated originally to this saint as well. John Leland gives details from a Latin hagiography of Ia, which is no longer extant.

See also

List of Cornish saints
Christianity in Cornwall

References

External links

Late Ancient Christian female saints
5th-century Christian saints
5th-century Christian martyrs
6th-century Christian saints
Medieval Irish saints of Cornwall
People from County Meath
St Ives, Cornwall
Year of death unknown
Year of birth unknown
Irish princesses
5th-century Irish women
6th-century Irish women
5th-century Irish people
5th-century English women
5th-century English people
6th-century Irish people
6th-century English women
6th-century English people
Female saints of medieval Ireland